Gunilla Carlsson (born 1966) is a Swedish Social Democratic politician. She has been a member of the Riksdag since 2002.

External links
Gunilla Carlsson at the Riksdag website

Members of the Riksdag from the Social Democrats
Living people
1966 births
Women members of the Riksdag
Articles containing video clips
Members of the Riksdag 2002–2006
Members of the Riksdag 2006–2010
Members of the Riksdag 2010–2014
Members of the Riksdag 2014–2018
Members of the Riksdag 2018–2022
Members of the Riksdag 2022–2026
21st-century Swedish women politicians